The 2014–15 Turkish Men's Volleyball League was the 45th edition of the top-flight professional men's volleyball league in Turkey.

Regular season

League table

Play-out

Playoffs

Classification group

Final group

References

External links 
Turkish Volleyball Federastion official web page

Men's
2014 in Turkish sport
2015 in Turkish sport